Kugidel (Kügiźel) is a rural locality (a village) in Bilyalovsky Selsoviet, Baymaksky District, Bashkortostan, Russia. The population was 411 as of 2010. There are 5 streets.

Geography 
Kugidel is located 72 km north of Baymak (the district's administrative centre) by road. Semyonovo is the nearest rural locality.

References 

Rural localities in Baymaksky District